André Drobecq (25 November 1900 – 18 July 1997) was a French racing cyclist. He finished in last place in the 1926 Tour de France to which he participated as a tourist routier.

References

External links

1900 births
1997 deaths
French male cyclists
Place of birth missing